David Pritchard (born 27 May 1972) is an English former professional footballer, who played for West Bromwich Albion, Telford United and Bristol Rovers.

Pritchard began his career at West Brom, before moving on to Telford United. He moved to Bristol Rovers in 1994, making 163 appearances for the club and scoring just one goal. He was forced to retire from the game due to a knee injury in 2002.

He now lives in Spain, where he works in the real estate industry as a fully qualified Senior Agent Account Manager for online property portal Propertyshowrooms.com. He is also a coach at Inter Marbella Football Academy.

External links

1972 births
Living people
Footballers from Wolverhampton
English footballers
West Bromwich Albion F.C. players
Telford United F.C. players
Bristol Rovers F.C. players
English Football League players
Association football fullbacks